The Blackburnian warbler (Setophaga fusca) is a small New World warbler. They breed in eastern North America, from southern Canada, westwards to the southern Canadian Prairies, the Great Lakes region and New England, to North Carolina.

Blackburnian warblers are migratory, wintering in southern Central America and in South America, and are very rare vagrants to western Europe.

Etymology

These birds were named after Anna Blackburne, an English botanist.

Description

Blackburnian warblers are small passerines and average-sized wood-warblers. In summer, male Blackburnian warblers display dark gray backs and double white wing bars, with yellowish rumps and dark brown crowns. The underparts of these birds are white, and are tinged with yellow and streaked black. The head is strongly patterned in yellow and black, with a flaming-orange throat. It is the only North American warbler with this striking plumage. Other plumages, including the fall male and adult female, are washed-out versions of the summer male, and in particular lack the bright colors and strong head pattern. The Blackburnian warbler is practically unmistakable if seen well, even the female due her dull-yellow supercilium, contrasting with greyish cheeks and yellow throat contrasting with the dark streaky sides and back. The only other wood-warbler with an orange throat is the flame-throated warbler of Central America and is very distinctive, lacking the contrasting blackish streaking about the head and whitish underside of a male Blackburnian. Basic plumages show weaker yellows and gray in place of black in the breeding male. Blackburnian warblers' songs are a simple series of high swi notes, which often ascend in pitch. Transliterations have included zip zip zip zip zip zip zip zip, titititi tseeeeee or teetsa teetsa teetsa teetsa. Their call is a high sip. Genetic research has shown that their closed living relative is the bay-breasted warbler, the latter species perhaps specialized to forage in the same coniferous trees at lower levels. Hybridization in the wild has been recorded once each with a bay-breasted warbler (in West Virginia), with a black-and-white warbler (in Pennsylvania) and possibly a wintering hybrid with a Kirtland's warbler (in Hispaniola).

Ecology
Blackburnian warblers are solitary during winter and highly territorial on their breeding grounds and do not mix with other passerine species outside of the migratory period. However, during migration, they often join local mixed foraging flocks of species such as chickadees, kinglets and nuthatches. Similarly, in the tropics they were found to be fairly social while engaging in migration but solitary from other passerines while wintering. These birds are basically insectivorous, but will include berries in their diets in wintertime. They usually forage by searching for insects or spiders in treetops. Their breeding season diet is dominated by the larvae of Lepidoptera, i.e. moths and butterflies. They may help control the spruce budworm (often considered a harmful pest) when breakouts occur, at the local if not at epidemic level. In one study from Ontario, 98% of the diet was made of insects, the remaining 2% being spiders. Among the migratory Setophaga warblers, it is considered one of the specialist at foraging in the micro-habitat of the tree's top canopy.

The breeding habitats of these birds are mature coniferous woodlands, the central part of their breeding range being in the southeastern portion of Canada's boreal forest. However, their distribution as a breeding species continues broadly down much of New England and the Appalachian Mountains, from New York to northernmost Georgia, in elevated mixed woodlands, especially ones containing spruce and hemlocks. Hemlocks in particular are most likely to host Blackburnian warblers in mixed forests.

Blackburnian warblers begin their first clutches in mid-May to early June in the contiguous United States and about 1 to 2 weeks later in Quebec. This species build a nest consisting of an open cup of twigs, bark, plant fibers, and rootlets held to branch with spider web and lined with lichens, moss, hair, and dead pine needles that's placed near the end of a branch. Although typically only laying one brood per year, if a nest is destroyed they are capable of producing a second or even third brood. Nests usually constructed outwardly with twigs, bark, plant fibers, and rootlets; lined with lichens, mosses, fine grasses, hair, dead pine needles, and even occasionally such exotic substances as string, willow cotton, horsehair, and cattail down. Only the female broods and spends about 80% day actively brooding, with the male usually helping bring food to the nest. Among warblers, they are relatively rarely parasitized at the nest by brown-headed cowbirds, most likely due to the cowbirds lack of success in dense pine-dominated forests. Blue jays and American red squirrels have been verified to prey on nestlings and new fledglings, while a merlin was recorded killing a brooding adult female. Sharp-shinned hawks and Cooper's hawks are likely, but not confirmed, predators of adult Blackburnian warblers. By far the greatest threat faced by this species is destruction of forest habitat, which some predict could cause the Blackburnian warbler to lose up more than 30% of its wintering or breeding habitat. However, currently this species continues to occur over a large range and can appear in stable numbers where habitat is appropriate.

References

External links

 
Blackburnian warbler species profile - The Nature Conservancy
Blackburnian warbler species account - Cornell Lab of Ornithology
Blackburnian warbler - Dendroica fusca - USGS Patuxent Bird Identification InfoCenter
Stamps (for Cuba, Grenada) with Range Map at bird-stamps.org
 

Blackburnian warbler
Native birds of Eastern Canada
Native birds of the Northeastern United States
Birds of Appalachia (United States)
Birds of Cuba
Birds of Grenada
Birds of South America
Blackburnian warbler
Blackburnian warbler